Pervomaysky is a rural locality (a settlement) and the administrative center of Timiryazevsky Selsoviet of Mamontovsky District, Altai Krai, Russia. The population was 666 in 2016. There are 11 streets.

Geography 
Pervomaysky is located 36 km north of Mamontovo (the district's administrative centre) by road. Komsomolsky is the nearest rural locality.

References 

Rural localities in Mamontovsky District